A Lin Htae Ka Lu is a 2019 Burmese action drama television series. It aired on MRTV-4, from May 20 to June 28, 2019, on Mondays to Fridays at 20:45 for 30 episodes.

Cast

Main
Si Phyo as Si Phyo
Mone as Mya Thway Chal
San Toe Naing as Arkar Min
Shin Min Set as Htar Shin
Ju Jue Kay as Yamin Phyo

Supporting
Kyaw Htet as Thaung Yee
Thuta Aung as Wanna
Aung San Htut as Naing Win
Sharr as Kauk Kauk
Aung Khant Muu as Thone Nya

References

Burmese television series
MRTV (TV network) original programming